Ksenia Andreyevna Semyonova (born 20 October 1992) is a retired Russian artistic gymnast. She is the 2007 world champion on the uneven bars, the 2008 European champion on the uneven bars and the balance beam, and the 2009 European all-around champion. She also won a gold medal with the Russian team at the 2010 World Artistic Gymnastics Championships. She represented Russia at the 2008 Summer Olympics where she finished fourth in the team competition, fourth in the all-around, and sixth in the uneven bars final.

Personal life 
Semyonova was born on October 20, 1992, in Novomoskovsk, Russia. In September 2016 she married Russian gymnast Denis Ablyazin and on January 21, 2017 she gave birth to their son, Yaroslav Ablyazin. 

Semyonova and Ablyazin divorced in 2018, with Semyonova having full custody of their son.

Career

2007 
Semyonova's initial international success was at the WOGA Classic in January, where she placed first on uneven bars and balance beam. She continued her success as part of the Russian team at the Gymnix International in Montreal, scoring an exceptional 15.95 on uneven bars, blowing away the rest of the field with her world leading start value of 7.2. She also won balance beam with a 15.85 and placed 3rd in floor exercise. In March at the Russian National Championships, she helped the Central region to victory in the team competition, won the uneven bars with 15.975 and took 3rd on beam. Semyonova was unable to compete at the European championships in April but returned to win the uneven bars competition at the Russian Cup in July. Her main competition of the year came at the 2007 World Championships in September, where she succeeded in becoming world champion on the uneven bars, scoring 16.35 over Nastia Liukin and Yang Yilin, making her the first Russian world champion in gymnastics since Svetlana Khorkina in 2003.

2008 
Semyonova's first major meet came in April with the European championships, where she helped Russia take silver in the team competition and secured gold in both the uneven bars and the balance beam, with scores of 15.9 and 15.95 respectively. In May she competed at the Moscow Stars World Cup, where she won another gold on the bars, scoring 16.075. Her success continued in June when she finished 2nd at the Dutch Open, behind Anna Pavlova, the two of them leading an all Russian sweep of places first to sixth. Semyonova had problems during the Russian Cup in July, where she fell on beam in qualifications and on vault in the all around final, but she still managed to take silver behind her teammate Afanasyeva.

2008 Summer Olympics
Aged just 15, Semyonova represented Russia at the 2008 Summer Olympics and placed fourth in the all-around, just out of medal contention. Semyonova's team was considered to be one of the top four competitive teams (along with China, the USA, and Romania), but narrowly missed an opportunity to medal in Beijing, trailing the third place Romanian team by less than a full point. Semyonova also placed sixth in the uneven bars competition. In the team preliminaries, she placed eighth overall on balance beam; her excellent scores almost qualified her to compete in the balance beam finals. However, only two athletes from each country may compete in the event finals. Her teammates Pavlova and Afanasyeva qualified in sixth and seventh place, edging her out of the competition. Semyonova and Afanasyeva both earned a score of 15.775, but the tie-breaking rules gave the advantage to Afanasyeva. Semyonova competed in the uneven bars finals, placing a respectable 6th, but was left behind the front runners Nastia Liukin, Yang Yilin, He Kexin and Beth Tweddle because of a deficit in start value, which Semyonova had little time to upgrade due to her determination to excel in the all-around competition. Semyonova ended the season with a wrist injury that prevented her from competing at the World Cup finals in Madrid.

2009 
Semyonova started her season at the Russian National Championships, where she placed second in the all around to junior Aliya Mustafina. She won the uneven bars and floor exercise to book her place on the European championships squad. Semyonova placed first in the all-around competition at the 2009 European Championships in Milan, Italy, just ahead of her teammate Afanasyeva. In the event finals, she was second on the uneven bars behind Beth Tweddle of the United Kingdom and third on floor, behind Tweddle and the 2006 World Champion, the Italian Vanessa Ferrari. Semyonova also qualified for the balance beam final and finished in fifth place with an uncharacteristically shaky routine. In July she suffered a minor injury to her wrist, keeping her out of the Russian Cup, but was confirmed to the Russian team for the world championships in October along with Yekaterina Kurbatova, Anna Myzdrikova and Afanasyeva, who eventually withdrew due to an injury. After a qualifying round marred by wobbles and a fall on her floor routine, she was 10th going into the all-around but failed to make any event finals. Another fall from the uneven bars during the first rotation prevented her from a better placement and she finished 13th overall.

2010 
The season was marred by injuries for Semyonova, who had to sit out the earlier competitions to rest a back injury. Nevertheless, she competed at the European championships in Brussels on floor and beam and qualified for the floor final, from which she eventually gave up her spot to let her teammate Myzdrikova (who went on to win the silver medal) compete. She also contributed to Russia's gold medal in the team final. Semyonova was selected to compete at the World Championships in Rotterdam, again only competing in two events. Whereas her beam routine in the qualifying round was steady and well-executed, she counted two falls in her floor exercise on her opening pass (double layout) and on her double pike. Another steady beam routine helped her team to win Russia's first team world title in history and earned Semyonova her second world title. She retired after the competition due to injuries and growth spurts.

Post-competitive career 
Semyonova has become a meet judge and regularly attends meets that members of the several Russian gymnastics teams compete in. She also helps coach at her old gymnastics club. In September 2016, she married fellow Russian Olympic gymnast Denis Ablyazin, but they have since divorced. They have one son, Yaroslav.

Routines 
As of 2009, Semyonova performed the following routines:

Special skills 
Semyonova performed the "Tkatchev to immediate giant full" combination on the uneven bars and may be the first female gymnast to perform it (but the combination [toe-on] Tkatchev to immediate giant was already performed by former gymnasts like Elise Ray in 2000's or Roza Galieva in 1993). This move is usually done by men on the horizontal bar. She also performed a Deltchev salto on uneven bars, now an unusual skill in the women's sport and an uncommon piked double Arabian dismount.

Eponymous skill 
Semyonova has one eponymous skill listed in the Code of Points.

Competitive history

See also 

 List of Olympic female gymnasts for Russia

References

External links
 
 
 

1992 births
Living people
Russian female artistic gymnasts
World champion gymnasts
European champions in gymnastics
Gymnasts at the 2008 Summer Olympics
Olympic gymnasts of Russia
Sportspeople from Tula, Russia
Medalists at the World Artistic Gymnastics Championships
Originators of elements in artistic gymnastics
21st-century Russian women